Crashh is an Indian Hindi-language original drama web series which is streaming on ALTBalaji and ZEE5. It stars Zain Imam, Rohan Mehra, Aditi Sharma, Kunj Anand and Anushka Sen. The web series released on 14 February 2021. It is written by Nikita Dhond, directed by Kushal Zaveri and co-directed by Preeti Gupta. Produced by Ekta Kapoor with production house as Balaji Telefilms.

Synopsis 
It is a story of sibling love and the pain of being separated at a young age. In the year of 2001, a happy family was torn apart by a fateful accident, the survivors were four siblings Kabir, Kajol, Jashn and Jia. The siblings were suddenly orphaned and find refuge in an orphanage. Kabir being the eldest always promised to take care of his family but soon all three siblings are adopted by their families and Kabir was left all alone in this world. He then decides to find his long lost siblings Kajol, Jia (who is renamed as Alia) and Jashn (who is named now as Rahim after adoption.) Alia is now a rich spoilt girl and her twin brother Rahim serves her as her Driver. He treats Alia as her own sister and loves her very much as a sister. Kajol lives with her adoptive mother who has an affair with a married man. Alia and kajol cross paths and things don't go right between them. Later Kabir finds out that Kajol is her sister and they unite. At the end of the last episode, he realizes that Jia is nobody else but Alia.

Cast
The series features the following casts:
 Kunj Anand as Kabir 
 Aditi Sharma as Kajal Sehgal
 Rohan Mehra as Jashn/Rahim Ansari (after adoption)
 Anushka Sen as Jia/Alia Mehra (after adoption)
 Zain Imam as Rishab Sachdev
 Meena Mir as Rahim's Mother
 Sonali Khare
 Aanchal Khurana as Madhurima Mehra
 Sonali Sudan as Razia
Tuhinaa Vohra as Divya
Syed Raza Ahmed as Puneet Kapoor
Vihaan Choudhary as Aditya Mehra

Releases 
On 24 December 2020, ALTBalaji on its official Instagram profile announced that the web series will release on 14 February 2021. The web series trailer was launched on 4 February 2021.

Episodes

Reception

Critical reception 
Ronak Kotecha from The Times of India review team has given this web series as 2.5/5 stars stating that it is an overtly emotional sibling drama. Overall writing and execution of the series failed to capitalize the strength. What more needed was to land safely heart tugging moments and real characters.

References

External links 
 
 Crashh at ZEE5
 Crashh at ALTBalaji

Hindi television content related lists
Hindi-language web series
Hindi-language television shows
ALTBalaji original programming
Indian drama web series